Edelstal is a township in the district of Neusiedl am See, in the Austrian state of Burgenland.

History
There was a 9th-century Avar settlement on its borders, it is near the Roman fortress Carnuntum.

The town was destroyed in 1529 and 1683 by the Turks.

Before the Treaty of Trianon it was in the Rajka district (Hungarian: Jaras) of Moson county (comitatus) in the Kingdom of Hungary.

Population

Personalities
In 1785 the List (later Liszt) family moved from here to Kittsee (Köpcsény), Adam Liszt (the composer's father) was born here.

Sights
It has a Roman Catholic church dating from 1740 dedicated to Saint Stephen.

Economy
The mineral water from the nearby Römerquelle springs has been bottled since 1890.

Politics 
The township's mayor is Anton Moritz of the Sozialdemokratische Partei Österreichs (SPÖ), the vice-mayor is Gerald Handig of the Österreichische Volkspartei (ÖVP) and the chief civil servant is Ulrike Ingrid Handig.

In the local council of thirteen seats, the SPÖ holds seven seats, the ÖVP five, and the Freiheitliche Partei Österreichs (FPÖ) one.

References 

Cities and towns in Neusiedl am See District